The 2003 United States House of Representatives special election in Texas's 19th congressional district was held on June 3, 2003 to select the successor to Larry Combest (R) who resigned to spend more time with his family. In accordance with Texas law, the special election was officially nonpartisan.

On May 3, seventeen candidates, including eleven Republicans, competed on the same ballot. However, as no candidate was able to achieve a majority, a runoff was held a month later.

Runoff
Former Mayor pro tempore of Lubbock Randy Neugebauer narrowly won in the runoff over Mike Conaway, the Chairman of the Texas Board of Public Accountancy, despite the latter's connections to then-President and former Governor of Texas George W. Bush.

References

United States House of Representatives 19
2003 19
Texas 19
Texas 2003 19
United States House of Representatives 2003 19
Texas 2003 19